Kindred Spirits: A Tribute to the Songs of Johnny Cash is a tribute album to country singer Johnny Cash, released on Legacy Recordings on September 24, 2002 (see 2002 in music), several days after the previous tribute album to Cash, Dressed in Black. The record features several legendary musicians, including Little Richard and Bob Dylan, as well as Cash's daughter Rosanne.  It concentrates primarily on Cash's biggest hits, such as "Folsom Prison Blues", "Hey Porter" and "I Walk the Line", although "Ring of Fire", one of Cash's most well-known songs, was not covered.

Track listing

Personnel

 Dwight Yoakam - Vocals
 Rosanne Cash - Vocals
 Bob Dylan - Vocals
 Little Richard - Vocals
 Keb Mo' - Vocals
 Travis Tritt - Vocals
 Hank Williams Jr. - Vocals
 Charlie Robison - Vocals
 Mary Chapin Carpenter - Vocals
 Sheryl Crow - Vocals
 Emmylou Harris - Vocals
 Steve Earle - Vocals
 Janette Carter - Vocals
 Johnny Cash - Vocals
 June Carter Cash - Vocals
 Earl Scruggs - Vocals
 Connie Smith - Vocals
 Darrin Vincent - Vocals
 Marty Stuart - Vocals, Producer
 Bruce Springsteen - Vocals, Producer
 The Mudcats - Performers
 Chad Hailey - Engineer
 Claude "Swifty" Achille - Engineer

Chart performance

References

Country albums by American artists
2002 compilation albums
Johnny Cash tribute albums
Legacy Recordings compilation albums